Merag Gewog is a gewog (village block) of Trashigang District, Bhutan. Merak and Sakten Gewogs comprise Sakten Dungkhag (sub-district).

Economy
Yak and sheep farming have traditionally been the main occupations in Merag, though sheep farming is on the decline due to it being more arduous and there being a distinct lack of grazeable pasture. Yak milk and butter are produced, along with yak hair for weaving clothes.

References

Gewogs of Bhutan
Trashigang District